The 2003 Youth Asia Cup was an international under-19 cricket tournament held in Karachi, Pakistan, from 14 to 27 July 2003. The fifth ACC under-19 tournament to be held, it was originally scheduled to be held in Singapore, but was moved to Karachi as a precaution against the SARS outbreak. The Asian Cricket Council (ACC) and Pakistan Cricket Board (PCB) shared organising responsibilities.

Nepal defeated Malaysia in the final, winning its second title and qualifying for the 2004 Under-19 World Cup in Bangladesh. Played during the usual off-season in Pakistan, the tournament was heavily impacted by monsoon rains – three matches (including the final) were shortened, three ended in no result (including a semi-final), and five were abandoned entirely (including the other semi-final), with no play possible. The player of the tournament was Oman's Adnan Ilyas, who was the leading runscorer, and also one of three players who led the tournament's wicket-taking, alongside Nepal's Manjeet Shrestha and Kuwait's Waqas Jamil.

Squads

Group stages

Source: CricketArchive

Group A

Group B

Finals

Semi-finals

Final

Statistics

Most runs
The top five runscorers are included in this table, ranked by runs scored and then by batting average.

Source: CricketArchive

Most wickets

The top five wicket takers are listed in this table, ranked by wickets taken and then by bowling average.

Source: CricketArchive

Final standing

References 

Under-19 regional cricket tournaments
Sport in Karachi
International cricket competitions in 2003
2003 in Pakistani cricket
International cricket competitions in Pakistan
July 2003 sports events in Asia